NTV Uganda is a Ugandan television station under the Nation Media Group, NMG, operating in East Africa. It has been on air since 2006. It is one of the companies owned by Aga Khan IV.

During the Arua elections, NTV Uganda reporter Herbert Zziwa and cameraman Ronald Muwanga were arrested for allegedly inciting violence. It was also banned from covering aerial footage of National Resistance Movement rallies in the 2016 general elections.

In 2020 the media house reached one million followers on Twitter.

According to GeoPoll, together with NBS, they have got higher COVID-19 lockdown viewership.

In 2014, it was alleged that NTV Uganda wanted to buy NBS Television.

Presenters

Current presenters/hosts
 Faridah Nakazibwe
 Josephine Karungi
 Solomon Kawesa
 Frank Walusimbi
 Crysto Panda
 Lynda Ddane
 Andrew Kyamagero
 Patrick Mukasa
 Mc Esco
Sandra Nakiwala
Sandra Kahumuza
Sammy Wetala
Rita Kanya
Raymond Mujuni
Romeo Busiku
Just Gystin
Patrick Kamara

Former presenters/hosts
Joel Ssenyonyi
Agnes Nandutu
Flavia Tumusiime
Maurice Mugisha
Arnold Segawa
Joel Khamadi

Programming

News
National
NTV Akawungeezi
NTV Tonight
International
Business
Sports
Science & Tech
SparkTV News

Shows

Drama

References

Television stations in Uganda
Mass media companies of Uganda